The Athi elephant-snout fish (Mormyrus tenuirostris) is a species of ray-finned fish in the family Mormyridae. It is endemic to Kenya. Its natural habitat is rivers.

References

Mormyrus
Fish described in 1882
Taxa named by Wilhelm Peters
Endemic freshwater fish of Kenya
Taxonomy articles created by Polbot